Stryjno Pierwsze  is a village in the administrative district of Gmina Rybczewice, within Świdnik County, Lublin Voivodeship, in eastern Poland.

The village has a population of 320.

References

Stryjno Pierwsze